This is a list of the historical names for 'Louth', the village and county in Ireland. The Placenames Branch, Dept. of Arts, Heritage and the Gaeltacht undertakes research into the placenames of Ireland to provide authoritative Irish language versions of those placenames for official and public use. Below are from surviving records are a result of their research.

Native sources 
Native sources (Irish and Latin) from 6th - 19th century.

Official sources

12th – 16th century 
Official administrative sources (Church and state) 12th – 16th century.

20th century 
Official administrative sources (state) 20th century.

Controversy over County name 

In 2003 the provisions of Part 5 of Acht na dTeangacha Oifigiúla / The Official Languages Act, revoked the Placenames Act of 1973. Legal status in An tOrdú Logainmneacha (Contae Lú) / The Placenames Order (County Louth), declared the official version of the barony, parish and village of Louth to be Lú. That same year the Irish version of the name of the county, Contae Lú, was given legal status in An tOrdú Logainmneacha (Cúigí agus contaetha) / The Placenames Order (Provinces and counties).

However, Louth County Council consistently refused to accept Lú as the Irish translation. Contae Lughaí was used on signposts erected on roads entering the county, the Crest of the Council states Chontae Lughaí, and in 2007 Comhairle Chontae Lughaí (Louth County Council) was used in the IPA’s Administration Yearbook & Diary.

In 2006 Louth County Council submitted a proposal to An Príomhoifigeach Logainmneacha, to change Lú to Lughaí. During 2007 the proposal was investigated by Dónall Mac Giolla Easpaig, of An Príomhoifigeach Logainmneacha. The proposal was dismissed in December 2007, with a declaration that Lughaí was fictitious, had no historical significance, and no link to previous Irish lexical. During the Louth County Council meeting held in County Hall, Dundalk on Monday 31 March 2008, no objections to the response, and Lú has since been used as the Irish word for Louth. Minute No. 48/08 of this meeting states: "The correspondence from the Dept of Gaeltacht, Community and Rural affairs and the Placenames Commission regarding the Irish title of County Louth as discussed with members raising no objections to the Placenames Commission recommendation of Lú but requesting that advice be sought on the correct spelling of Lú in its tuiseal ginideach (genitive case) form"

References

External links 
List of Published Texts at CELT — University College Cork's Corpus of Electronic Texts project has the full text of the annals online, both in the original Irish and in O'Donovan's translation.

Lists of place names
Irish toponymy